Michel Georges Jean Ghislain Preud'homme (born 24 January 1959) is a Belgian retired footballer and manager who played as a goalkeeper. Currently, he is vice-president and sports director at Standard Liège.

He was considered one of the world's best and most consistent goalkeepers during his professional career; he was the first winner of the Yashin Award as the best goalkeeper at the 1994 FIFA World Cup.

At club level, Preud'homme played for Standard Liège, Mechelen and Benfica. With Mechelen, he won the Belgian Cup in 1987, the Cup Winner's Cup and the European Super Cup in 1988 and the Belgian league title in 1989. He also won the Portuguese Cup with Benfica in 1996. He retired as a player in 1999, aged 40. For Belgium, Preud'homme was capped 58 times, from 1979 to 1995. Other than the 1994 World Cup, he also played in the 1990 tournament.

Club career

Standard Liège
Preud'homme is a product of Standard Liège's youth system, which he joined at 10 years old in 1969. He was first called up to the first team in 1977 and made his senior debut in August 1977 after early injuries to the main goalkeeper Christian Piot and his successor Jean-Paul Crucifix. With Standard Liège Preud'homme won the Belgian First Division in 1981–82 and 1982–83.
He was also runner-up in the 1981–82 UEFA Cup Winners' Cup, losing against F.C. Barcelona.

KV Mechelen
Preud'homme was transferred to KV Mechelen in 1986. The following seasons would become the most successful for the player (as well for the club), winning the 1986-87 Belgian Cup, the 1987-88 European Cup Winners' Cup, the 1988 European Super Cup and the 1988-89 Belgian First Division.

Benfica
Preud'homme moved to Portuguese club Benfica in 1994, becoming the first foreign goalkeeper in Benfica's history. He made his debut on 21 August, against Beira-Mar. On 18 May 1996, Michel won his first trophy in Portuguese football as Benfica defeated Lisbon rivals Sporting CP 3–1 in the Taça de Portugal final.

For his outstanding performances and almost impossible saves, he was nicknamed "Saint Michel" by supporters of Benfica. On 10 August 1999, he played his last match, an off season friendly against Bayern Munich. After his retirement, at age 40, he became Benfica's director of international relations.

International career
Preud'homme made his senior debut on 2 May 1979 in a 0–0 draw with Austria in a UEFA Euro 1980 qualifying match. He served as third keeper behind Jean-Marie Pfaff and Theo Custers in the UEFA Euro 1980 as Belgium lost in the final against West Germany.

Preud'homme represented Belgium in two consecutive FIFA World Cups: 1990 and 1994 – the latter being his last competition at international level, where he was awarded with the Yashin Award for best goalkeeper, and was included in the FIFA World Cup All-Star Team, as Belgium reached the round of 16 of the tournament, only to be eliminated by defending champions Germany following a 3–2 defeat.

Preud'homme made his final appearance for Belgium on 17 December 1994 in a 4–1 defeat to Spain, in a UEFA Euro 1996 qualifying match.

Style of play
A world-class, elegant, efficient, and consistent goalkeeper, regarded as one of the greatest goalkeepers of all time, Preud'homme was mainly known for his excellent shot-stopping abilities, quick reflexes, agility, strength, tenacity, handling and his ability to come off his line to collect crosses, as well as his tendency to produce spectacular and decisive saves.

Managerial career
After his professional football career, Michel Preud'homme stayed at Benfica to become technical director. In September 2000, he suggested the club approach José Mourinho to become the head coach.

Standard Liège
Preud'homme has been the head coach of Standard Liège twice, the first time from December 2000 to May 2002 and the second time from August 2006 to the end of the 2008 season. After leaving his technical director duties at Benfica, he replaced Tomislav Ivić on 20 December 2000. In May 2002, he left his coaching position to become Standard's sporting director.

On 30 August 2006, after Dutchman Johan Boskamp was sacked due to poor results, Preud'homme left his sporting director duties and became Standard's manager for the second time in his career. After his return to the club, Standard Liège won in 2008 its first Belgian Championship in 25 years, and it therefore came as a surprise when he was appointed manager of Gent for the 2008–09 season.

Gent
Preud'homme moved to Gent on 27 May 2008. With Gent he finished second in the Jupiler Pro League, this was their highest place ever (together with the 1954–1955 season). He also won the Belgian Cup, it was the third time in the history of the club that they won that trophy.

Twente
On 23 May 2010, it was confirmed that Preud'homme would replace Steve McClaren as the head coach of Twente, despite the interest of Porto and Milan. On 31 July 2010, he won his first trophy in Dutch football as Twente defeated Ajax 1–0 in the Johan Cruyff Shield match. In the last competition match of the season, Twente lost to Ajax, which meant the Dutch title went to Amsterdam and Twente finished runners-up. On 8 May 2011, Twente defeated Ajax 3–2 after extra time in the KNVB Cup final held at the De Kuip in Rotterdam.

Al-Shabab Riyadh
On 13 June 2011, FC Twente confirmed Preud'homme's departure to Saudi Arabian club Al-Shabab Riyadh on its website . By the end of the transfer window, he brought Brazilian central midfielder Fernando Menegazzo and Uzbekistani midfielder Server Djeparov.

On 10 September 2011, Al-Shabab won 3–1 at Al-Faisaly in Preud'homme's first Saudi Professional League game as manager. On 10 March 2012, he succeeding Anderlecht coach Ariel Jacobs on winning the Guy Thys Award, the prize for the coach who most contributed to the image of his profession and football.

On 14 April 2012, after a 1–1 draw against Al-Ahli, Al-Shabab clinched the Saudi Professional League title after six years since they had won it for the last time. Shabab finishing the league undefeated, with 19 victories and 7 draws. At the end of the season, he was won the Saudi Arabia Manager of the Year award.

On 10 May, Preud'homme was rewarded with a new contract extension, running until 2016. On 18 September 2013, he and Al-Shabab agreed to part ways, allowing him to sign for Club Brugge one day later.

Club Brugge
After Juan Carlos Garrido was fired, Preud'homme was appointed head coach of Club Brugge on 19 September 2013. Six days later, he made his debut in a 1–0 win against Oudenaarde. At the end of the season, Preud'homme signed a new contract to remain as Club Brugge manager until 2019.

On 11 February 2015, Preud'homme reached his third Belgian Cup Final, after eliminating rivals Cercle Brugge 8–3 on aggregate. On 22 March 2015, he won that final against rivals Anderlecht. It was the first trophy for Club Brugge in eight years. At the end of the season, he was voted Belgian Professional Manager of the Year for the second time.

Preud'homme started the new season losing the 2015 Belgian Super Cup to Gent. In the Belgian Cup, Brugge won 0–2 in the quarter-final against Westerlo. On 3 February 2016, they eliminated Gent on the away goals rule to reach the Cup Final for the second year in a row. Brugge lost the match 2–1 to Standard Liège.

On 15 May 2016, after finishing first in the regular season, Preud'homme won the Jupiler Pro League with Club Brugge in a 4–0 win over Anderlecht. It took the club 11 years since their last victory in the Belgian competition. On 23 May, he was voted Manager of the Year for the third time, the second consecutive.

Return to Standard Liège
On 23 May 2018, Preud'homme signed with Standard Liège.

Career statistics

International

Managerial statistics

Honours

Player
Standard Liège
Belgian First Division: 1981–82, 1982–83
Belgian Cup: 1980–81
Belgian Supercup: 1981, 1983
European Cup Winners Cup runner-up: 1981–82
Intertoto Cup Group Winners: 1980, 1982, 1984

KV Mechelen
Belgian First Division: 1988–89
Belgian Cup: 1986–87European Cup Winners Cup: 1987–88
European Super Cup: 1988BenficaTaça de Portugal: 1995–96BelgiumUEFA European Championship runner-up: 1980
Belgian Sports Merit Award: 1980

ManagerStandard LiègeBelgian Pro League: 2007–08GentBelgian Cup: 2009–10TwenteKNVB Cup: 2010–11
Johan Cruyff Shield: 2010Al-ShababSaudi Professional League: 2011–12Club BruggeBelgian Pro League: 2015–16
Belgian Cup: 2014–15
Belgian Super Cup: 2016

IndividualPlayerBelgian Golden Shoe: 1987, 1989
Belgian Goalkeeper of the Year: 1988, 1989, 1990, 1991
Ballon d'Or nominations: 1988, 1989, 1994
Belgian Sports Merit Award: 1989
Belgian Fair Play Award: 1989
FIFA World Cup Yashin Award: 1994
FIFA World Cup All-Star Team: 1994
Best European Goalkeeper of the Year: 1994
IFFHS World's Best Goalkeeper of the Year: 1994
Belgian Golden Shoe of the 20th Century (5th): 1995
IFFHS European Keeper of the Century (19th): 2000
The Best Golden Shoe Team Ever: 2011
Bleacher Report 50 Greatest Goalkeepers in Football History (6th): 2013
RBFA 125 Years Icons Team: 2020Manager'''
Belgian Professional Manager of the Year: 2007–08, 2014–15, 2015–16
Rinus Michels Award: Manager of the Year 2011
Guy Thys Award: 2012
Saudi Arabia Manager of the Year: 2012
Best Football Coach of the Year: 2016
Raymond Goethals Award: 2016

References

Further reading

External links

 
 
 

1959 births
1990 FIFA World Cup players
1994 FIFA World Cup players
Al Shabab FC (Riyadh) managers
Association football goalkeepers
Belgian expatriate footballers
Belgian expatriate sportspeople in Portugal
Belgian football managers
Belgian expatriate football managers
Belgian footballers
Belgian Pro League players
Belgium international footballers
Club Brugge KV head coaches
Eredivisie managers
FC Twente managers
K.A.A. Gent managers
K.V. Mechelen players
Living people
People from Seraing
Primeira Liga players
S.L. Benfica footballers
Standard Liège managers
Standard Liège players
UEFA Euro 1980 players
Footballers from Liège Province
Rinus Michels Award winners